Hearst may refer to:

Places
 Hearst, former name of Hacienda, California, United States
 Hearst, Ontario, town in Northern Ontario, Canada
 Hearst, California, an unincorporated community in Mendocino County, United States
 Hearst Island, an island in Antarctica
 Hearst Castle, a mansion built by William Randolph Hearst in San Simeon, California, United States
 Hearst Block, a provincial government building in Toronto, Ontario, Canada

People
 Hearst (surname)
 William Randolph Hearst (1863–1951), newspaper magnate
 Hunter Hearst Helmsley (b. 1969), WWE professional wrestler

Arts, entertainment, and media
 Hearst College, a fictional College in the CW series Veronica Mars
 Hearst Communications, a privately held media conglomerate
 Hearst Television, Hearst Communications' broadcast television division (formerly Hearst-Argyle Television)

Other uses
 Université de Hearst, a French-language university federated with Laurentian University, based in Hearst, Ontario

See also
 Herst (disambiguation)
 Hirst (disambiguation)
 Hurst (disambiguation)